A fixed price is a price set for a good or a service that is not subject to bargaining.  The price may be fixed because the seller has set it, or because the price is regulated by the authorities under price controls.

Bargaining is very common in many parts of the world, but not in most retail stores in Europe, North America, and Japan.  Elsewhere, fixed prices tend to be an exception from the norm.

Fixed-price tender

Fixed-price contract   

A fixed-price contract is a contract where the contract payment does not depend on the amount of resources or time expended by the contractor, as opposed to cost-plus contracts. Fixed-price contracts are often used for military and government contractors to put the risk on the side of the vendor and control costs.

Historically, when fixed-price contracts are used for new projects with untested or developmental technologies, the programs may fail if unforeseen costs exceed the ability of the contractor to absorb the overruns. In spite of this, such contracts continue to be popular. Fixed-price contracts tend to work best when costs are well-known in advance.

See also
F. W. Woolworth Company
Testimony of Integrity
Unit price
Variable pricing

References

Price controls